Iotyrris marquesensis is a species of sea snail, a marine gastropod mollusk in the family Turridae, the turrids.

Description
The length of the shell attains 29 mm.

Distribution
This marine species occurs off Hiva Oa Island, Marquesas Islands.

References

 Sysoev A.V. 2002. On the type species of Iotyrris Medinskaya et Sysoev, 2001 (Gastropoda, Turridae). Ruthenica 12(2): 169–171.
 Bouchet, P.; Fontaine, B. (2009). List of new marine species described between 2002 and 2006. Census of Marine Life.

External links

 MNHN, Paris: holotype
 Gastropods.com= Iotyrris marquesensis

marquesensis
Gastropods described in 2002